The Constitution of the United Arab Republic may refer to:

The Provisional Constitution of the United Arab Republic of the 1958–61 union of Egypt and Syria, the United Arab Republic
The Egyptian Constitution of 1964, officially the "Constitution of the United Arab Republic", in effect from 1964 to 1971